Hadj Merine (born 3 March 1978) is an Algerian football manager.

References

1978 births
Living people
Algerian football managers
ASM Oran managers
NC Magra managers
CR Témouchent managers
Algerian Ligue Professionnelle 1 managers
21st-century Algerian people